Bobrowo  is a village in the administrative district of Gmina Złocieniec, within Drawsko County, West Pomeranian Voivodeship, in north-western Poland.

The German name indicates that the village was founded in the Middle Ages by German settlers.

The village has a population of 324.

References

Bobrowo